Marshall Farms, based in North Rose, New York, is a commercial breeder of dogs and ferrets for pets and scientific research.  Marshall Pet Products, a division of Marshall Farms founded in 1993, sells a wide range of food, toys, and other accessories for ferrets and rabbits.

Founded in 1939 by Gilman Marshall, the company is currently the largest ferret breeder in the United States. Ferrets from Marshall are commonly seen in pet shops across the United States, Canada, and, increasingly, Japan; they are also used in biomedicine laboratories, particularly in the fields of viral and parasitic diseases, cardiovascular and behavioral research, and reproductive endocrinology.

Pet ferrets originating from Marshall Farms usually have two small dots tattooed in the right ear, though this practice is not exclusive to Marshall. One dot indicates that the ferret has been spayed or neutered; two indicate that its anal scent glands have also been surgically removed.

Animal rights groups such as PETA have attacked Marshall in the past for breeding animals for scientific and medical research. The firm was the subject of an Animal Liberation Front raid in 2001, in which it was claimed that 10 ferrets and 30 beagles were removed from the complex. Such cases have made Marshall an unpopular destination for new ferret owners.

References

External links
Marshall Pet Products Inc.
PETA criticism of Marshall Farms
Ferret Universe perspective on Marshall Farms
The Ferret FAQ on Marshall Farms

Dog breeding
Companies based in New York (state)
Animal rights
American companies established in 1939
Animal testing in the United States
1939 establishments in New York (state)